The First Battle of Seoul, known in North Korean historiography as the Liberation of Seoul, was the North Korean capture of the South Korean capital, Seoul, at the start of the Korean War.

Background

On 25 June 1950, Korean People's Army (KPA) forces crossed the 38th Parallel and invaded South Korea. The KPA utilized a blitzkrieg style invasion using T-34 tanks supported by artillery. The Republic of Korea Army (ROKA) had no methods in stopping the onslaught of tanks as they lacked anti-tank weapons and had no tanks at all.

Battle
On 28 June the ROKA demolished the bridge across the Han River trapping soldiers from the 5th Division and killing hundreds of refugees evacuating the city. North Korean forces were able to cross the river later that day and occupy Seoul.

Aftermath 
On 30 June President of the United States Harry S. Truman released a statement that indicated the invasion of South Korea had grown the threat of Communism to the Pacific area and the United States. In response to the invasion, Truman ordered United States provide assistance with air and land forces in Korea. Moreover, Truman ordered the United States Seventh Fleet to prevent any attack on Formosa and strengthened the United States forces in the Philippines.

As a result of North Korea’s invasion, the United Nations Security Council (UNSC) passed United Nations Security Council Resolution 84. The Resolution authorised the use of the UN flag in operations against North Korean forces and those nations partaking. The UNSC provided a recommendation to members to provide assistance to South Korea in repelling the North Korean attack and restoring worldwide peace and security.

See also 

 Second Battle of Seoul
 Third Battle of Seoul
 Fourth Battle of Seoul

References

Seoul
1950s in Seoul
1950 in South Korea
Seoul
June 1950 events in Asia